Temmerman is a surname. Notable people with the surname include:

Els De Temmerman (born 1962), Belgian journalist
Gilbert Temmerman (1928–2012), Belgian politician
Marleen Temmerman (born 1953), Belgian politician

See also
Timmerman